The Somogyvár-Vinkovci culture was an Early Bronze Age archaeological culture in the Central Danube Carpathian Region. 

This culture occurred in parallel with the Makó-Kosihy-Čaka cultural group. The period of its development covers the entire Early Bronze Age, from 2300/2200 BC to 1700/1600 BC (calibrated years). This culture occurs throughout most of Transdanubia, stretching beyond the Sava River in the south, encompassing a large part of Serbia and South Moravia, eastern Bosnia and Montenegro, reaching as far as the Adriatic coast. It was preceded by the Vučedol culture.

The end of this culture is not clear. According to N. Tasic, its decline would fall in the early stage of the development of the Encrusted Pottery culture and the Vatin culture. This is based on the presence of pottery typical of the population of the Samogyvár-Vinkovci culture in the inventories of the groups mentioned.

Bibliography

  A Game of Clans, Carlos Quilles, Academia Prisca, 2019
 Kultury z przełomu eneolitu i epoki brązu w strefie karpackiej, Jan Machnik, Zakład narodowy imienia Ossolińskich, Wydawnictwo Polskiej Akademii Nauk, Wrocław 1987
 Stary i nowy świat (Od „rewolucji” neolitycznej do podbojów Aleksandra Wielkiego), pod red. Joachima Śliwy, Świat Książki, Fogra Oficyna Wydawnicza, Kraków 2005
 Die Vinkovci-Kultur, eine neue Kultur der Frühbronzezeit in Syrmien und Slawonien, N. Tasic, Archeologia Jugoslavica, t IX, 1968
 Geschichte der frühen und mittleren Bronzezeit in Ungarn und im mittleren Donauraum, I. Bóna, Annales Universitatis Scientiarum Budapesteniensis de Rolando Eötvös Nominatae, Sectio Historica, t. III, Budapest, 1961, s. 3-22
 Arheološka iskopavanja na području Vinkovačkog muzeja, rezultati 1957-1965, S. Dimitrijević, Acta Musei, Cibalensis, t. I, Vinkovci 1966

Further reading

References

Bronze Age cultures of Europe
Archaeological cultures of Southeastern Europe
Archaeological cultures in Croatia
Archaeological cultures in Hungary
Archaeological cultures in the Czech Republic
Archaeological cultures in Serbia
Archaeological cultures in Bosnia and Herzegovina